The Vanity Fair Diaries: 1983–1992 is a 2017 memoir by Tina Brown. The book has nine "positive" reviews, two "rave" reviews, and four "mixed" reviews, according to review aggregator Book Marks.

References

2017 non-fiction books
English-language books
Henry Holt and Company books
British memoirs